Cynoglossum australe commonly known as Australian hound's tongue, is a flowering plant in the family Boraginaceae. It is a perennial herb with blue, pink or whitish flowers and found in most states of Australia.

Description

Taxonomy and naming
Cynoglossum australe was first formally described in 1810 by Robert Brown and the description was published in Prodromus florae Novae Hollandiae.The specific epithet (australe) means "Australian".

Distribution and habitat
Australian hound's tongue is a widespread species found growing in a diverse range of locations including woodland, grassland, sand dunes and montane forest in Queensland, Victoria, New South Wales, Western Australia and the Australian Capital Territory.

References

australe
Flora of Australia
Flora of Queensland
Flora of Victoria (Australia)
Flora of Western Australia
Flora of South Australia
Flora of the Australian Capital Territory